Rukmini Maria Callimachi (born Sichitiu on 25 June 1973) is a Romanian-born American journalist. She currently works for The New York Times.

Background

Callimachi gained her name "Rukmini" through her family's closeness to the Indian theosophist Rukmini Devi Arundale, founder of Kalakshetra Foundation in Chennai, India. Born Sichitiu, she is the stepdaughter of Mihai Botez, a scientist and dissident against the Romanian communist regime. Rukmini is a matrilineal descendant of the Callimachi family of Phanariotes (and as such also Greco-Romanian); her ancestor on that side is Eufrosina Callimachi, daughter of Hospodar Scarlat Callimachi. She changed her last name to Callimachi in order to honor this legacy.

Rukmini Sichitiu left Romania at age 5, in 1979: her mother and grandmother took her on a trip to Switzerland, during which they defected; Rukmini's father remained in Bucharest, to alleviate suspicions, and finally joined them in 1980. According to her own recollections, she had a hard time fitting into Swiss society. Four years later, her parents were separated. While her father stayed in Lausanne, Rukmini and her mother left for Ojai, California, where Rukmini attended primary school. She is a graduate of The Oak Grove School and The Thacher School. She took diplomas from Dartmouth College and from Exeter College of the University of Oxford, where she did a graduate course in linguistics.

Career

After publishing some poetry, Callimachi became a freelancer in New Delhi, India, including for Time magazine. In 2003, she joined the Associated Press in Portland, Oregon. After a year in New Orleans documenting the aftermath of Hurricane Katrina, in 2006 she began reporting out of Dakar, Senegal, as a West African correspondent for the Associated Press. There she focused on investigating the exploitation of children in West and Central Africa, for which she was named a Pulitzer Finalist in International Reporting in 2009. Callimachi later became known for her work on extremism, and was again named Pulitzer Finalist in 2014 for "her discovery and fearless exploration of internal documents that shattered myths and deepened understanding of the global terrorist network of al-Qaida."

In 2014, Callimachi was hired by The New York Times. Her reporting focused on Islamic extremism, which helped the Times earn a Pulitzer Finalist accolade in 2016 as part of a group entry. Callimachi's work in investigative journalism was recognised in 2016, as she won the inaugural International Center for Journalists' Integrity in Journalism Award, for her "exceptional contribution to exposing crimes against humanity".

In 2020, Callimachi was reassigned at the Times and will no longer cover terrorism.

ISIS reporting

Caliphate

The serialized audio documentary Caliphate, first released in April 2018, follows Callimachi as she reports on the Islamic State, and the accounts of Abu Huzaifa al-Kanadi, who claimed to have murdered people while fighting for the Islamic State, and since returned to Canada where he was living freely. The podcast won a Peabody Award in the radio/podcast category that year. Her work on Caliphate also made her a Pulitzer Finalist again, "[f]or dissecting the power and persistence of the ISIS terror movement, through relentless on-the-ground and online reporting, and masterful use of podcast storytelling."

In May 2018, the reliability of Huzaifa's story had received concerns from television journalist Diana Swain of CBC News, who suggested that he may be "lying" to The New York Times. In September 2020, the Canadian Abu Huzaifa whose real name was Shehroze Chaudhry, was arrested by Royal Canadian Mounted Police (RCMP) and charged under Canadian hoax laws for fabricating his story on social media of traveling to Syria and joining ISIS, which was covered by the Caliphate podcast produced by The New York Times. His case is ongoing. In response to criticism of Caliphates depiction of Chaudry's story, the Times announced on September 30 that the paper would begin a "fresh examination" of the series's reporting.

In December 2020, The New York Times admitted that much of the podcast had been based on bad information, that significant errors had been made at the newspaper, and that the Caliphate "podcast as a whole should not have been produced with Mr. Chaudhry as a central narrative character." Callimachi was reassigned as a result. On December 18, 2020, the Times also announced that, in view of the results of its investigation, it will return the Peabody Award which had been won by the Caliphate podcast.

The ISIS Files
Over 15,000 files, now known as "The ISIS Files"—obtained by Callimachi  and her "Iraqi colleagues during embeds with the Iraqi army"—were digitize[d], translate[d], analyze[d], and publish[ed]" by The New York Times and George Washington University in an "exclusive partnership". The two partners announced their intentions to do so in 2018, and by 2020, the files have been online.

There has been criticism of how Callimachi acquired the ISIS Files. The documents are alleged to have been removed from Iraq without permission, displaying a "neo-imperial mindset".

After digitization, the files were given to the Embassy of the Republic of Iraq in Washington, DC.

Awards
 2018 Peabody Award in News and Radio/Podcast (later returned by the New York Times) 
 2016 Aurora Prize for Integrity in Journalism.
 2014 Michael Kelly Award and finalist in 2009 and 2012
 2012 McGill Medal for Journalistic Courage from the Grady College of Journalism and Mass Communication
 2011 Eugene S. Pulliam National Journalism Writing Award from Ball State University for her article, "Haiti-Hotel Montana".
 2009 Pulitzer Prize Finalist "for her in-depth investigation of the exploitation of impoverished children in West and Central Africa"
 2007 Sidney Hillman Foundation Award, "Coverage of Hurricane Katrina aftermath," The Associated Press
 2004 John M. Templeton Religion Story of the Year award, The Daily Herald (Ill.), "Passage from India"
 1998 Keats-Shelley Prize for Poetry

Works

News

Poetry
"The Anatomy of Wildflowers", Keats Shelley

See also
 Islamic extremism
 Romanian Americans

References

External links

"RUKMINI CALLIMACHI", Free Library
"RUKMINI CALLIMACHI", Newsvine 
Interview, Longform Podcast #129''
The ISIS Files  These files include 15,000 pages of internal ISIS files obtained Callimachi and her team.

1973 births
Living people
21st-century American women writers
21st-century American poets
American women poets
American newspaper journalists
American women journalists
Associated Press reporters
The New York Times writers
Alumni of Exeter College, Oxford
Dartmouth College alumni
Rukmini
Journalists from Bucharest
Writers from Bucharest
Romanian defectors
Romanian emigrants to Switzerland
Romanian emigrants to the United States
The Thacher School alumni